Company officer may refer to:

 Company officer (firefighter)
 Company-grade officer, in United States military usage, a Second Lieutenant, First Lieutenant, or Captain
 Corporate officer, of a business